A rugby union tournament was held in May 1936, three months prior to the 1936 Summer Olympics in Berlin.  Rugby union had been an official Olympic sport in 1900, 1908, 1920 and 1924, but was dropped from the Olympic program after the 1924 Paris Games.  The 1936 tournament is not mentioned in the official report of the organising committee of the Berlin Games, and has never been given the status of an official demonstration sport for those Games.

Four teams competed in the 1936 tournament, which was considered one of the "best organized and most international rugby tournaments to date".  France defeated Germany in the final.

Teams

French players 

Forwards : Francis Daguerre (Biarritz Olympique), André Goyard (Lyon OU), André Rochon (AS Montferrand), Étienne Ithurra (Biarritz Olympique), M. Laurent (FC Auch), François Raynal (USA Perpignan), Louis Dupont (Racing club de France), Lucien Cognet (AS Montferrand).

Backs : Pierre Thiers (AS Montferrand), Georges Libaros (Stadoceste Tarbais), Maurice Celhay (Aviron Bayonnais), Joseph Desclaux (c) (USA Perpignan), Jean Coderc (Racing club chalonnais), Pierre Geschwind (Racing club de France), Maurice Savy (AS Montferrand).

Substitutes : R. Lombarteix (AS Montferrand), Prud'homme (Lyon olympique universitaire), R. Arotca (Aviron Bayonnais), J. Dorot (Racing club de France), J. Blond (Stade Français), J. Fau (Union sportive carcassonnaise XV), F. Raynaud (Union sportive carcassonnaise XV), F. Sahuc (Stade Toulousain), M. Capendeguy (Saint-Jean-de-Luz olympique rugby).

Managers : René Crabos, Jean Semmartin and Lanusse.

German players 

Forwards : M. Schroers (DRC Hannover), K. Metzger (SC Frankfurt 1880), E. Derleth (Frankfurt TV 60), Erwin Thiesies (Tennis Borussia Berlin), H. Kocher (RG Heidelberg), A. Koch (SV Odin Hannover), W. Pfisterer (RG Heidelberg), O. Oppermann (FV 1897 Linden).

Backs : K. Loos (Heidelberger RK), H. Hanning (Rasenspiele Hannover), K. Hübsch (Heidelberger RK), H. Schwanenberg (c) (DSV 78 Hannover), W. Zichlinski (FV 1897 Linden), W. Dünnhaupt (SV Odin Hannover), G. Isenberg (DSV 78 Hannover).

Substitutes : A. Aue, W. Roth, F. Bukowski.

Manager : ?.

Italian players 

Forwards : Tommaso Fattori (Rugby Roma Olimpic), S. Bonfante (CUS Torino Rugby), G. Zoffoli (Rugby Roma Olimpic), A. Albonico (CUS Torino Rugby), Vincenzo Bertolotto (CUS Torino Rugby), G. Visentin (Amatori Rugby Milano), I. Aloisio (Amatori Rugby Milan), A. Re-Garbagnati (Amatori Rugby Milano).

Backs : M. Campagna (c) (Amatori Rugby Milan), G. Piana (CUS Torino Rugby), R. Maffioli (Amatori Rugby Milano), F. Vinci III (Rugby Roma Olimpic), G. Rizzoli (Rugby Bologna 1928), A. Cazzini (Amatori Rugby Milano), R. Centinari (Amatori Rugby Milano).

Substitutes : O. Maestri (Amatori Rugby Milano), E. Sgorbati (Amatori Rugby Milano), Vigliana (CUS Torino Rugby), Ardissone (CUS Torino Rugby), Pinardi (CUS Torino Rugby).

Manager : Michel Boucheron.

Romanian players 

Forwards : I. Tarabega, G. Fantaneanu, S. Ionescu, S. Barsan, S. Burlescu, G. Ionescu, E. Marculescu, C. Beju.

Backs : A. Marasescu, N. Crissoveloni (c), A. Damian, I. Popa, C. Grigorescu, I. Irimia, C. Dinescu.

Substitutes : A. Matescu, Nicolescu, Epure, Craciunescu, Tudor, E. Sfetescu, M. Slobozeanu, Anastasiade, Florea.

Manager : ?.

References

 (de) Hermann Meister, "Deutsche Rugby-Zeitung", dans Deutsche Rugby-Zeitung, vol. 17, n° 20, 22 mai 1936.
 (fr) Lucien Dubech, "Rugby continental", dans L'Auto, 37e année, n° 12.934, 15 mai 1936.
 (fr) Pierre Vitalien, "Le Rugby aux Jeux Olympiques", Sérignan-du-Comtat, Imprimerie Technicouleurs, octobre 2007. .
 (ro) Web site : https://web.archive.org/web/20101110150826/http://dropgol.ro/2010/10/26/istoric-echipa-nationala-1934-1937/.
 (it) Benedetto Pasqua and Mirio Da Roit, Cent'anni di rugby a Torino, Turin, Ananke, mai 2011, broché, 247 p. .

External links

 FIRA Trophy, France – Germany 
 FIRA Trophy, Italy – Romania 
 FIRA Trophy, France – Romania 
 FIRA Trophy, Germany – Italy 

1936
International rugby union competitions hosted by Germany
1936 rugby union tournaments for national teams
1935–36 in French rugby union
1935–36 in Italian rugby union
rugby union
rugby union
Rugby union in Berlin